Hedonism Live is the second live DVD by folk band Bellowhead. It was recorded in May 2011 at the O2 Academy Bournemouth.

Track listing 
    Yarmouth Town
    A-Begging I Will Go
    Trip To Bucharest
    Amsterdam
    Whiskey Is The Life Of Man
    Two Magicians
    Parson's Farewell
    Cold Blows The Wind
    Fakenham Fair
    Cross-Eyed And Chinless
    Broomfield Hill
    Unclothed Nocturnal Manuscript Crisis
    Captain Wedderburn
    The Handweaver And The Factory Maid
    Across The Line
    Roll Her Down The Bay
    Cholera Camp
    Haul Away
    Little Sally Racket
    Sloe Gin
    New York Girls
    London Town
    Frog's Legs And Dragon's Teeth

Personnel 
Jon Boden - lead vocals, fiddle, tambourine
John Spiers - melodeon, Anglo-concertina
Benji Kirkpatrick - guitar, bouzouki, mandolin, tenor banjo
Andy Mellon - trumpet, flugelhorn
Justin Thurgur - trombone
Brendan Kelly - saxophone, bass clarinet
Ed Neuhauser  - Helicon, Tuba
Pete Flood - percussion
Rachael McShane - cello, fiddle
Paul Sartin - fiddle, oboe
Sam Sweeney - fiddle, bagpipes

References 

Bellowhead albums
2011 video albums